Nałęczów  is a spa town (population 4,800) situated on the Nałęczów Plateau in Puławy County, Lublin Voivodeship, eastern Poland. Nałęczów belongs to Lesser Poland.

History
In the 18th century, the discovery there of healing waters initiated the development of a health resort; the main treatments are for circulatory disorders. The water is now bottled, and sold around the world under the brand: Nałęczowianka.  

Notable landmarks include the 18th-century baroque-classicist Małachowski Palace (1771–73, since remodeled) and a park and resort complex dating from the 18th-19th centuries.

Nałęczów was the favorite vacationing place of novelist Bolesław Prus for three decades from 1882 till his death in 1912.  It features museums devoted to Prus and to novelist Stefan Żeromski, a fellow frequent visitor whose literary career Prus generously furthered.

The local Jewish population was 250-400 Jews in 1939. In the spring of 1942, Nałęczów was used as a transfer point by the occupying Germans, who herded area Jews onto cattle rail cars, to be transported to both Bełżec and Sobibor death camps. The Jewish community ceased to exist.

Twin towns
Nałęczów is twinned with:

  Steglitz-Zehlendorf (Germany)
  Nyíracsád (Hungary)
  Trenčianske Teplice (Slovakia)
  Longueau (France)
  Serhiyivka (Ukraine)

Gallery

References

Cities and towns in Lublin Voivodeship
Puławy County
Spa towns in Poland
Palaces in Poland
Lesser Poland
Lublin Governorate
Lublin Voivodeship (1919–1939)
Holocaust locations in Poland